USS Ripple has been the name of more than one United States Navy ship, and may refer to:

 USS Ripple, the name between 4 February 1916 and 10 April 1918 of a ferryboat built as USS Wave, renamed USS Faithful on 10 April 1918, and designated  on 17 July 1920
 , a minesweeper in commission from 1918 to 1919

Ripple